Paul Felix Hoffman, FRSC, OC (born March 21, 1941) is a Canadian geologist and  Sturgis Hooper Professor Emeritus of Geology at Harvard University.  He specializes in the Precambrian era and is widely known for his research on Snowball Earth glaciation in the Neoproterozoic era particularly through his research on sedimentary rocks of Namibia.

Born in Toronto, Ontario, he received a B.Sc. from McMaster University in 1964, a M.Sc. from Johns Hopkins University in 1965, and was awarded a Ph.D. by Johns Hopkins University in 1970, where his doctoral advisor was Francis J. Pettijohn.

Paul Hoffman formerly worked for the Geological Survey of Canada and was subsequently the Sturgis Hooper Professor of Geology at Harvard University.  He currently resides in Victoria, British Columbia where he has an appointment within the University of Victoria School of Earth and Ocean Science.

He is also the brother of Abby Hoffman, a Pan American Games gold medalist and Olympian in track and field. Both have received the Order of Canada for accomplishments in different fields.

Honours 
In 1974, he was awarded the Geological Association of Canada's Past-Presidents' Medal
In 1991 he was awarded the Canadian Society of Petroleum Geologists's R. J. W. Douglas Medal
In 1992 he was awarded the Geological Association of Canada's highest honour, the Logan Medal
In 1997 he was awarded the Royal Society of Canada's Willet G. Miller Medal
In 2009 he received the Wollaston Medal of the Geological Society
In 2011 he was awarded the Geological Society of America's Penrose Medal
In 2012 he was made an Officer of the Order of Canada
In 2016 he was awarded the Gold Medal of the Royal Canadian Geographical Society

Works 
Hoffman, Paul F. (1968) Stratigraphy of the Lower Proterozoic (Aphebian), Great Slave Supergroup, east arm of Great Slave Lake, District of Makenzie Ottawa: Geological Survey of Canada OCoLC 111430495
P F Hoffman; D Kurfurst (1988) Geology and tectonics, East Arm of Great Slave Lake, District of Mackenzie, Northwest Territories Ottawa: Geological Survey of Canada OCLC 22412425
P F Hoffman; L Hall (1993) Geology, Slave craton and environs, District of Mackenzie, Northwest Territories Ottawa: Geological Survey of Canada OCLC 290944947
Hoffman, P.F., Kaufman, A.J., Halverson, G.P. & Schrag, D.P. (1998) “A Neoproterozoic snowball Earth” Science 281, 1342-46
Hoffman, P.F. & Schrag, D.P. (2000) “Snowball Earth” Scientific American 282, 68-75
Hoffman, P.F. & Schrag, D.P. (2002) “The snowball Earth hypothesis: testing the limits of global change” Terra Nova 14, 129-155
Snowball Earth (2005) Rita Chang & Alan Fine OCLC 165116212

References

External links
Short Hoffman bio
Snowball Earth Theory
Snowball Earth web site
Geological Association of Canada Medals and Awards
 Miller Medal Royal Society of Canada

1941 births
Living people
Canadian geologists
Geological Survey of Canada personnel
Fellows of the Royal Society of Canada
Harvard University faculty
Johns Hopkins University alumni
Foreign associates of the National Academy of Sciences
McMaster University alumni
People from Toronto
Logan Medal recipients
Wollaston Medal winners
Officers of the Order of Canada
Penrose Medal winners